The 2014 Road to the Kentucky Derby  was a series of races in which horses earned points to qualify for the 2014 Kentucky Derby. The points system replaced the previous qualifying method that looked at earnings in hundreds of graded stakes races worldwide. The series is divided into two phases, the Kentucky Derby Prep Season and the Kentucky Derby Championship Series.

The top 20 point earners earned a spot in the Kentucky Derby starting gate. Up to 24 horses could enter the race and four horses can be listed as "also eligible" and would be ranked in order accordingly in case any horse(s) be scratched prior to the race. If two or more horses have the same number of points, the tiebreaker to get into the race will be earnings in non-restricted stakes races, whether or not they are graded. In the event of a tie, those horses will divide equally the points they would have received jointly had one beaten the other. Horses listed as "also eligible" are not allowed to participate in the race once wagering is opened.

The 2014 season consisted of 34 races, 17 races for the Kentucky Derby Prep Season and 17 races for the Kentucky Derby Championship Season.

Standings

Series results

Notes

See also

 Road to the Kentucky Oaks

References

External links
Churchill Downs official web site
Road to the Kentucky Derby Point System

Road to the Kentucky Derby, 2014
Road to the Kentucky Derby
Road to the Kentucky Derby